Kalat County is in Razavi Khorasan province, Iran. The capital of the county is the city of Kalat. At the 2006 census, the county's population was 39,560 in 9,489 households. The following census in 2011 counted 38,232 people in 10,298 households. At the 2016 census the county's population was 36,237, in 10,708 households.

Administrative divisions

The population history of Kalat County's administrative divisions over three consecutive censuses is shown in the following table. The latest census shows two districts, four rural districts, and two cities.

Demographics 
Around half of the people of Kalat County are Tekke Turkmen; 35% are Kurdish and 15% are Persian.

References

 

Counties of Razavi Khorasan Province